General Humphreys may refer to:

Andrew A. Humphreys (1810–1883), Union Army major general
Benjamin G. Humphreys (1808–1882), Confederate States Army brigadier general
Thomas Humphreys (British Army officer) (1878–1955), British Army lieutenant general